Peter Vogelius Deinboll (8 January 1783 Copenhagen – 13 May 1874 Aker, Norway) was a Danish-Norwegian priest, parliamentary representative and entomologist. He was the son of Christian Deinboll and Karen Christiane Holm, and lived most of his adult life in Norway, serving as a vicar in East Finnmark and later at Løten in Hedmark. He married Anna Marie Dorthea Deinboll and they raised a son August Thorvald Deinboll.

His interest in politics led him to the Storting as representative of Finnmark for the terms 1821 and 1824. For his considerable contributions to science and politics, he was made a knight of the Order of St. Olav.

He was honoured in 1827, when botanists Schumach. & Thonn. named a genus of plants Deinbollia after him.

References

1783 births
1874 deaths
Danish politicians
Danish priests
Danish entomologists
19th-century Danish botanists
Danish emigrants to Norway
Members of the Storting
Finnmark politicians